Turbo Time is a 1983 Italian documentary film directed by Antonio Climati as James Davis and written by Mario Morra and .

Plot
Documentary about the world of car and motorcycle racing, accompanied by interviews with several champions of these sports.

Release
The film was released in Italy on September 29, 1983.

See also
 List of Italian films of 1983

Notes

External links
 

1983 films
Italian auto racing films
Italian documentary films
1983 documentary films
Formula One mass media
Motorcycle racing films
Documentary films about auto racing
1980s Italian films